The annual convention of the ISNA (Islamic Society of North America) is the largest annual gathering of Muslim Americans to discuss their role in society, politics, public media, activism, educational institutions, etc.

The convention occurs every Labor Day weekend and also include parallel conventions by the Muslim Students' Association (MSA) of North America, the Muslim Youth of North America (MYNA), and The Islamic Medical Association of North America (IMA or IMANA) as well as many other smaller groups associated under the umbrella group ISNA. Attendance in recent years peaked close to 50,000, which is a significant number especially considering the total Muslim population in America is reasonably estimated at 6-7 million. (Other estimates have the number as low as 2 million or as high as 10 million, but these are considered biased estimates).

The convention was held in the following cities in prior years:
 1971 - Green Lake, Wisconsin - Green Lake Conference Center (formerly American Baptist Assembly)
 1972 - St. Charles, Missouri - Lindenwood College
 1973 - East Lansing, Michigan - Michigan State University
 1976 - St. Catharines, Ontario - Brock University
 1977 - Bloomington, Indiana - Indiana University 
 1979 - Oxford, Ohio - Miami University
 1980 - Oxford, Ohio - Miami University
 1981 - Bloomington, Indiana - Indiana University 
 1982 - Bloomington, Indiana - Indiana University
 1983 - Louisville, Kentucky - Commonwealth Convention Center
 1984 - Dayton, Ohio - Dayton Convention Center
 1988 - Indianapolis, Indiana
 1989 - Dayton, Ohio - Dayton Convention Center
 1990 - Dayton, Ohio - Dayton Convention Center
 1991 - Dayton, Ohio - Dayton Convention Center
 1992 - Kansas City - Kansas City Convention Center
 1993 - Kansas City - Kansas City Convention Center
 1994 - Chicago - Chicago Hyatt Regency
 1995 - Columbus, Ohio - Greater Columbus Convention Center
 1996 - Columbus, Ohio - Greater Columbus Convention Center
 1997 - Chicago - Chicago Hilton & Towers
 1998 - St. Louis, Missouri - St. Louis Convention Center
 1999 - Chicago - Rosemont Convention Center
 2000 - Chicago - Rosemont Convention Center
 2001 - Chicago - Rosemont Convention Center
 2002 - Washington D.C. - Washington Convention Center
 2003 - Chicago - Rosemont Convention Center
 2004 - Chicago - Rosemont Convention Center
 2005 - Chicago - Rosemont Convention Center
 2006 - Chicago - Rosemont Convention Center
 2007 - Chicago - Donald E. Stephens Convention Center (formerly Rosemont Convention Center)
 2008 - Columbus, Ohio - Greater Columbus Convention Center
 2009 - Washington D.C. - Walter E. Washington Convention Center
 2010 - Chicago - Donald E. Stephens Convention Center
 2011 - Chicago - Donald E. Stephens Convention Center
 2012 - Washington D.C. - Walter E. Washington Convention Center
 2013 - Washington D.C. - Walter E. Washington Convention Center
 2014 - Detroit - Cobo Center
 2015 - Chicago - Donald E. Stephens Convention Center
 2016 - Chicago - Donald E. Stephens Convention Center
 2017 - Chicago - Donald E. Stephens Convention Center
 2018 - Houston - George R. Brown Convention Center
 2019 - Houston - George R. Brown Convention Center
 2020 - scheduled for Chicago but canceled in person and converted to virtual convention due to COVID-19
 2021 - Virtual convention
 2022 - Chicago - Donald E. Stephens Convention Center
 2023 - Chicago - Donald E. Stephens Convention Center

(Note: the 2009–2011 conventions were held on the Fourth of July weekend instead of Labor Day weekend to avoid the convention occurring during Ramadan. Similarly, the 2017 convention was also scheduled for the Fourth of July weekend to avoid the convention occurring during  the Hajj / Eid al-Adha timeframe).

Convention Themes in Prior Years:
 1971 The Call of Islam
 1976 Human Rights in Islam
 1977 The Islamic Renaissance - its Requirements and Realization
 1979 Life of the Prophet Mohammad (pbuh) and its Relevance to Muslims in North America
 1980 Opportunities and Challenges of 15th Century Hijrah
 1981 Human Rights: An Islamic Perspective
 1982 Why Islam
 1983 Islam in North America: Approaches & Methods
 1984 Islam and You
 1986 Islam in North America: Directions and Strategies
 1988 Muslims for Human Dignity
 1989 Reaching Out with Islam
 1990 Muslims in 1990s & Beyond: A Community of Solutions
 1991 Developing an Islamic Environment in North America
 1992 Shaping Our Future: Knowledge and Action for Building an Islamic Environment
 1993 Muslims for a Better America
 1994 Our Youth, Our Family, Our Future
 1995 Islam: Our Choice
 1996 Muslims for Peace and Justice
 1997 Muslims for Moral Excellence
 1998 Muslims for Human Dignity
 1999 Islam: Guidance for Humanity
 2000 Islam: Faith & Civilization
 2001 Strength through Diversity
 2002 Islam: A Call for Peace and Justice
 2003 Islam: Enduring Values for Daily life
 2004 Islam: Dialogue, Devotion and Development
 2005 Muslims in NA: Accomplishments, Challenges and the Road Ahead
 2006 Achieving Balance in faith, Family and Community
 2007 Upholding Faith and Serving Humanity
 2008 Ramadan: A Time for Change
 2009 Life, Liberty, and the pursuit of happiness
 2010 Nurturing Compassionate Communities
 2011 Loving God, Loving Neighbor, Living in Harmony
 2012 One Nation Under God: Striving for the Common Good
 2013 Envisioning a More Perfect Union: Building the Beloved Community
 2014 Generations Rise: Elevating Muslim American Culture
 2015 Stories of Resilience: Strengthening the American Muslim Narrative
 2016 Turning Points: Navigating Challenges, Seizing Opportunities
 2017 Hope and Guidance through the Quran
 2018 In God We Trust
 2019 What's your super power for social good?
 2020 The Struggle for Social and Racial Justice: A Moral Imperative
 2021 Reimagine & Rebuild with Renewed Resolve
 2022 Resilience, Hope, & Faith: With Hardship, Comes Ease
 2023 TBD

Islamic organizations based in the United States
Islamic conventions